The Stem Player is an audio remix device and music streaming platform developed by British technology company Kano Computing in collaboration with American artist Kanye West. The device was launched in August 2021 in conjunction with the release of West's 10th studio album Donda.

The Stem Player has four touch-sensitive haptic sliders that adjust individual stems for tracks, and six hardware buttons for volume and effects. The device's service uses artificial intelligence to split tracks into four stems (sometimes isolated vocals, bass, and drums) with each track being able to be manipulated using a front slider. Users can add tracks to the device by uploading an audio file to the device through an official online web application.

In February 2022, West made an announcement that he would begin releasing music exclusively to the device, commencing with his final album Donda 2 that month.

There are a number of third party sites and apps for the Stem Player, including most notably Stemify2 and Stemdrive

History 
In January 2019, following an encounter within the company's booth at CES Technology Show in Las Vegas, West met company CEO Alex Klein and invited him over to his Calabasas home for breakfast. In a 2019 interview with journalist Zane Lowe for Apple Music, West confirmed he was working on developing a portable stem player.

On 25 August 2021, the Stem Player launched for pre-sale with the initial name of "Donda Stem Player". The device began shipping to purchasers in October that year, pre-loaded with three tracks not available on streaming platforms, including "Life of the Party" and other remixes that appeared on the Donda album.

As of February 2022, sixteen tracks from Donda 2 are available for the player.

In January 2023, in light of West’s antisemitic remarks, Kano announced that their collaboration with West has ended, and that the Donda Stem Player would be discontinued after they sold through the remaining stock of 5,000 units. At the same time, Kano announced a new variant of the Stem Player developed in collaboration with Ghostface Killah that would not include Donda 2 or any other content from West.

Service 
The Stem Player mainly features a service that splits chosen songs into stems that can then be freely customized and manipulated using the device's touch-sensitive sliders and buttons; emulated versions of the service were widely circulated online in early 2022 following criticism of the Stem Player's expenses. It features controls for vocal isolation and volume control, real time loop and speed controls, tactile audio effects, audio track management, recording of mixes and recording playback.

The Stem Player is a beige, circular device, measuring 7 centimetres in diameter. 4 touch-sensitive LED sliders cover the front of the device. Physical specifications include 8GB of storage, USB-C connectivity, and support for Bluetooth.

In early February 2023, Untitled Engineering announced a new 3rd party suite of apps for the Stem Player, including most notably stemdrive, a way to split and add stems to the Stem Player with the Apple iPhone, and other previously compatible devices.

Reception 
Upon initial release, the Stem Player was met with a generally mixed to positive reception. Critics praised the device for its unique design as well as its AI-based technology. Criticism of the device was mainly relayed on the lack of wireless file downloading, limited storage space, low transfer speeds, and the omission of a navigation screen.
In a review for online publication The Verge, Jay Peters found that "for someone who likes to make their own music, the Stem Player could be a mind-blowingly awesome tool." Jordan Minor of PCMag said "while the Donda Stem Player is an imaginative and surprisingly flexible music creation tool…it’s more of a toy than a path to superstardom". Terence O' Brien of Engadget called the device "fascinating and unique" but saw its design as “slightly unnerving”, criticized the instructions as “pretty barebones and at times, slightly confusing”, and was “disappointed by the Stem Player’s ability to handle non-Donda tracks”.

West received criticism following the announcement of his exclusive music releases on the platform, with many fans expressing concern and uncertainty that they would not be able to listen to the latest release as a result. Corey Taylor of Slipknot criticized West for the decision due to the price: "People can't afford their apartments, for fuсk's sake." This resulted in an emulator of the device being developed that people have used as an alternative to buying the device.

References 

Audio storage
Mixing consoles
Portable electronics
Mobile music apps
Kanye West